Ólafur Tryggvason Thors (19 January 1892 – 31 December 1964) was an Icelandic politician of the Independence Party, who served five times as prime minister of Iceland.

Career
The son of Margrét Þorbjörg Kristjánsdóttir and Thor Philip Axel Jensen, Ólafur Thors was a member of parliament from 1926 until the day of his death in 1964. His first ministerial post was as a substitute justice minister from 14 November 1932 to 23 December 1932. In his political career he served as Minister of Industrial Affairs from 1939 to 1942, foreign minister in his own governments in 1942 and 1944–1947, social minister in his own government from 1949 to 1950, fisheries and industrial minister from 1950 to 1953, and fisheries minister in his own government from 1953 to 1956. He attended the UN General Assembly in 1947 and 1948. Ólafur Thors led the Independence Party from 1934 to 1961. His fifth government with the Social Democrats sat under two other prime ministers from the Independence Party until 1971.

References

External links
 Biography on Britannica Online Encyclopedia

|-

|-

|-

|-

|-

1892 births
1964 deaths
Icelandic people of Danish descent
Leaders of the Independence Party (Iceland)
Prime Ministers of Iceland
Grand Crosses 1st class of the Order of Merit of the Federal Republic of Germany
Thors family
World War II political leaders